The 2021–22 Nashville Predators season was the 24th season for the National Hockey League franchise that was established on June 25, 1997. John Hynes entered his third season and second full season as head coach of the team.

The Predators opened the season at home on October 14, 2021, against the  NHL's expansion team, the Seattle Kraken. The Predators lost the game 4–3, giving the Kraken the franchise's first-ever win. On April 26, 2022, the Predators clinched a playoff berth after the Dallas Stars defeated the Vegas Golden Knights in a shootout. In the playoffs, the Predators were swept in the first round by the Colorado Avalanche.

Standings

Divisional standings

Conference standings

Schedule and results

Preseason

|- style="background:#ffc;"
| 1 || September 26 || @ Florida Panthers || 4–5 || OT || Cooley  || FLA Live Arena || 5,860 || 0–0–1 || 
|- style="background:#fcc;"
| 2 || September 26 || @ Florida Panthers || 1–3 || || Rittich || FLA Live Arena || 5,283 || 0–1–1 || 
|- style="background:#cfc;"
| 3 || September 30 || @ Tampa Bay Lightning || 6–2 || || Rittich || Amalie Arena || 11,054 || 1–1–1 || 
|- style="background:#cfc;"
| 4 || October 2 || Tampa Bay Lightning || 6–1 || || Saros || Bridgestone Arena || 14,884 || 2–1–1 || 
|- style="background:#cfc;"
| 5 || October 5 || @ Carolina Hurricanes || 3–2 || OT || Saros || PNC Arena || 7,011 || 3–1–1 || 
|- style="background:#cfc;"
| 6 || October 9 || Carolina Hurricanes || 4–3 || || Rittich || Bridgestone Arena || 15,095 || 4–1–1 || 
|-

Regular season

|- style="background:#fcc;"
| 1 || October 14 || Seattle Kraken || 3–4 || || Saros || Bridgestone Arena || 17,159 || 0–1–0 || 0 || 
|- style="background:#fcc;"
| 2 || October 16 || Carolina Hurricanes || 2–3 || || Saros || Bridgestone Arena || 17,162 || 0–2–0 || 0 || 
|- style="background:#cfc;"
| 3 || October 19 || Los Angeles Kings || 2–1 || || Saros || Bridgestone Arena || 17,159 || 1–2–0 || 2 || 
|- style="background:#fcc;"
| 4 || October 21 || New York Rangers || 1–3 || || Saros || Bridgestone Arena || 17,159 || 1–3–0 || 2 || 
|- style="background:#fcc;"
| 5 || October 23 || @ Winnipeg Jets || 4–6 || || Saros || Canada Life Centre || 14,020 || 1–4–0 || 2 || 
|- style="background:#cfc;"
| 6 || October 24 || @ Minnesota Wild || 5–2 || || Ingram || Xcel Energy Center || 16,014 || 2–4–0 || 4 || 
|- style="background:#cfc;"
| 7 || October 25 || San Jose Sharks || 3–1 || || Saros || Bridgestone Arena || 16,395 || 3–4–0 || 6 || 
|- style="background:#cfc;"
| 8 || October 30 || New York Islanders || 3–2 || SO || Saros || Bridgestone Arena || 17,159 || 4–4–0 || 8 || 

|- style="background:#cfc;"
| 9 || November 2 || @ Calgary Flames || 3–2 || OT || Saros || Scotiabank Saddledome || 14,324 || 5–4–0 || 10 || 
|- style="background:#fcc;"
| 10 || November 3 || @ Edmonton Oilers || 2–5 || || Ingram|| Rogers Place || 14,414 || 5–5–0 || 10 || 
|- style="background:#cfc;"
| 11 || November 5 || @ Vancouver Canucks || 3–2 || || Saros || Rogers Arena || 18,870 || 6–5–0 || 12 || 
|- style="background:#ffc;"
| 12 || November 7 || @ Chicago Blackhawks || 1–2 || OT || Saros || United Center || 16,891 || 6–5–1 || 13 || 
|- style="background:#cfc;"
| 13 || November 10 || @ Dallas Stars || 4–2 || || Saros || American Airlines Center || 17,560 || 7–5–1 || 15 || 
|- style="background:#cfc;"
| 14 || November 11 || @ St. Louis Blues || 4–3 || OT || Rittich || Enterprise Center || 18,096 || 8–5–1 || 17 || 
|- style="background:#cfc;"
| 15 || November 13 || Arizona Coyotes || 4–1 || || Saros || Bridgestone Arena || 17,159 || 9–5–1 || 19 || 
|- style="background:#fcc;"
| 16 || November 16 || @ Toronto Maple Leafs || 0–3 || || Saros || Scotiabank Arena || 18,949 || 9–6–1 || 19 || 
|- style="background:#ccc;"
| — || November 18 || @ Ottawa Senators ||  colspan="8"|Postponed due to multiple Senators players with COVID-19. Moved to April 7.
|- style="background:#fcc;"
| 17 || November 20 || @ Montreal Canadiens || 3–6 || || Saros || Bell Centre || 20,522 || 9–7–1 || 19 || 
|- style="background:#cfc;"
| 18 || November 22 || Anaheim Ducks || 3–2 || || Saros || Bridgestone Arena || 17,159 || 10–7–1 || 21 || 
|- style="background:#fcc;"
| 19 || November 24 || Vegas Golden Knights || 2–5 || || Saros || Bridgestone Arena || 17,174 || 10–8–1 || 21 || 
|- style="background:#cfc;"
| 20 || November 26 || New Jersey Devils || 4–2 || || Saros || Bridgestone Arena || 17,159 || 11–8–1 || 23 || 
|- style="background:#fcc;"
| 21 || November 27 || @ Colorado Avalanche || 2–6 || || Rittich || Ball Arena || 17,050 || 11–9–1 || 23 || 
|- style="background:#cfc;"
| 22 || November 30 || Columbus Blue Jackets || 6–0 || || Saros || Bridgestone Arena || 16,874 || 12–9–1 || 25 || 
|-

|- style="background:#fcc;"
| 23 || December 2 || Boston Bruins || 0–2 || || Saros || Bridgestone Arena || 17,159 || 12–10–1 || 25 || 
|- style="background:#cfc;"
| 24 || December 4 || Montreal Canadiens || 4–3 || OT || Saros || Bridgestone Arena || 17,159 || 13–10–1 || 27 || 
|- style="background:#cfc;"
| 25 || December 7 || @ Detroit Red Wings || 5–2 || || Rittich || Little Caesars Arena || 15,539 || 14–10–1 || 29 || 
|- style="background:#cfc;"
| 26 || December 9 || @ New York Islanders || 4–3 || || Rittich || UBS Arena || 17,255 || 15–10–1 || 31 || 
|- style="background:#cfc;"
| 27 || December 10 || @ New Jersey Devils || 3–2 || || Saros || Prudential Center || 14,218 || 16–10–1 || 33 || 
|- style="background:#cfc;"
| 28 || December 12 || @ New York Rangers || 1–0 || || Saros || Madison Square Garden || 16,177 || 17–10–1 || 35 || 
|- style="background:#ccc;"
| — || December 14 || Calgary Flames || colspan="8"|Postponed due to COVID-19. Moved to April 19.
|- style="background:#cfc;"
| 29 || December 16 || Colorado Avalanche || 5–2 || || Saros || Bridgestone Arena || 17,184 || 18–10–1 || 37 || 
|- style="background:#cfc;"
| 30 || December 17 || @ Chicago Blackhawks || 3–2 || OT || Saros || United Center || 18,298 || 19–10–1 || 39 || 
|- style="background:#ccc;"
| — || December 19 || @ Carolina Hurricanes || colspan="8"|Postponed due to COVID-19. Moved to February 18.
|- style="background:#ccc;"
| — || December 21 || Winnipeg Jets || colspan="8"|Postponed due to COVID-19. Moved to February 12.
|- style="background:#ccc;"
| — || December 23 || @ Florida Panthers || colspan="8"|Postponed due to COVID-19. Moved to February 22.
|- style="background:#ccc;"
| — || December 27 || @ Dallas Stars || colspan="8"|Postponed due to COVID-19. Moved to February 9.
|- style="background:#fcc;"
| 31 || December 29 || @ Washington Capitals || 3–5 || || Saros || Capital One Arena || 18,573 || 19–11–1 || 39 || 
|- style="background:#ffc;"
| 32 || December 30 || @ Columbus Blue Jackets || 3–4 || SO || Rittich || Nationwide Arena || 17,494 || 19–11–2 || 40 || 
|-

|- style="background:#cfc;"
| 33 || January 1 || Chicago Blackhawks || 6–1 || || Saros || Bridgestone Arena || 17,504 || 20–11–2 || 42 || 
|- style="background:#cfc;"
| 34 || January 4 || @ Vegas Golden Knights || 3–2 || || Saros || T-Mobile Arena || 17,804 || 21–11–2 || 44 || 
|- style="background:#cfc;"
| 35 || January 6 || @ Los Angeles Kings || 4–2 || || Saros || Crypto.com Arena || 14,359 || 22–11–2 || 46 || 
|- style="background:#cfc;"
| 36 || January 8 || @ Arizona Coyotes || 4–2 || || Saros || Gila River Arena || 10,317 || 23–11–2 || 48 || 
|- style="background:#cfc;"
| 37 || January 11 || Colorado Avalanche || 5–4 || OT || Saros || Bridgestone Arena || 17,159 || 24–11–2 || 50 || 
|- style="background:#fcc;"
| 38 || January 13 || Buffalo Sabres || 1–4 || || Saros || Bridgestone Arena || 17,159 || 24–12–2 || 50 || 
|- style="background:#ffc;"
| 39 || January 15 || @ Boston Bruins || 3–4 || OT || Saros || TD Garden || 17,850 || 24–12–3 || 51 || 
|- style="background:#fcc;"
| 40 || January 17 || @ St. Louis Blues || 3–5 || || Saros || Enterprise Center || 18,096 || 24–13–3 || 51 || 
|- style="background:#fcc;"
| 41 || January 18 || Vancouver Canucks || 1–3 || || Rittich || Bridgestone Arena || 16,676|| 24–14–3 || 51 || 
|- style="background:#cfc;"
| 42 || January 20 || Winnipeg Jets || 5–2 || || Saros || Bridgestone Arena || 17,159 || 25–14–3 || 53 || 
|- style="background:#cfc;"
| 43 || January 22 || Detroit Red Wings || 4–1 || || Saros || Bridgestone Arena || 17,455 || 26–14–3 || 55 || 
|- style="background:#cfc;"
| 44 || January 25 || @ Seattle Kraken || 4–2 || || Saros || Climate Pledge Arena || 17,151 || 27–14–3 || 57 || 
|- style="background:#ffc;"
| 45 || January 27 || @ Edmonton Oilers || 2–3 || SO || Saros || Rogers Place  || 9,150 || 27–14–4 || 58 || 
|-

|- style="background:#cfc;"
| 46 || February 1 || Vancouver Canucks || 4–2 || || Saros || Bridgestone Arena || 17,159 || 28–14–4 || 60 || 
|- style="background:#fcc;"
| 47 || February 9 || @ Dallas Stars || 3–4 || || Saros || American Airlines Center || 17,780 || 28–15–4 || 60 || 
|- style="background:#fcc;"
| 48 || February 12 || Winnipeg Jets || 2–5 || || Saros || Bridgestone Arena || 17,688 || 28–16–4 || 60 || 
|- style="background:#fcc;"
| 49 || February 15 || Washington Capitals || 1–4 || || Saros || Bridgestone Arena || 17,238 || 28–17–4 || 60 || 
|- style="background:#fcc;"
| 50 || February 18 || @ Carolina Hurricanes || 3–5 || || Saros || PNC Arena || 18,911 || 29–17–4 || 62 || 
|- style="background:#cfc;"
| 51 || February 22 || @ Florida Panthers || 6–4 || || Rittich || FLA Live Arena || 14,234 || 29–18–4 || 62 || 
|- style="background:#cfc;"
| 52 || February 24 || Dallas Stars || 2–1 || SO || Saros || Bridgestone Arena || 17,869 || 30–18–4 || 64 || 
|- style="background:#fcc;"
| 53 || February 26 || Tampa Bay Lightning || 2–3 || || Saros || Nissan Stadium || 68,619(outdoors) || 30–19–4 || 64 || 
|-

|- style="background:#fcc;"
| 54 || March 2 || @ Seattle Kraken || 3–4 || || Saros || Climate Pledge Arena || 17,151 || 30–20–4 || 64 || 
|- style="background:#cfc;"
| 55 || March 5 || @ San Jose Sharks || 8–0 || || Saros || SAP Center || 13,936 || 31–20–4 || 66 || 
|- style="background:#cfc;"
| 56 || March 8 || Dallas Stars || 2–1 || || Saros || Bridgestone Arena || 17,306 || 32–20–4 || 68 || 
|- style="background:#cfc;"
| 57 || March 10 || Anaheim Ducks || 4–1 || || Saros || Bridgestone Arena || 17,159 ||  33–20–4 || 70 || 
|- style="background:#fcc;"
| 58 || March 12 || St. Louis Blues || 4–7 || || Saros || Bridgestone Arena || 17,565 || 33–21–4 || 70 ||  
|- style="background:#cfc;"
| 59 || March 13 || @ Minnesota Wild || 6–2 || || Rittich || Xcel Energy Center || 19,009 || 34–21–4 || 72 || 
|- style="background:#cfc;"
| 60 || March 15 || Pittsburgh Penguins || 4–1 || || Saros || Bridgestone Arena || 17,498 || 35–21–4|| 74 ||   
|- style="background:#fcc;"
| 61 || March 17 || @ Philadelphia Flyers || 4–5 || || Saros || Wells Fargo Center || 18,405 || 35–22–4 || 74 || 
|- style="background:#cfc;"
| 62 || March 19 || Toronto Maple Leafs || 6–3 || || Saros || Bridgestone Arena || 17,692 || 36–22–4 || 76 ||   
|- style="background:#cfc;"
| 63 || March 21 || @ Anaheim Ducks || 6–3 || || Saros || Honda Center || 11,679 || 37–22–4 || 78 || 
|- style="background:#fcc;"
| 64 || March 22 || @ Los Angeles Kings || 1–6 || || Rittich || Crypto.com Arena|| 12,629 || 37–23–4 || 78 || 
|- style="background:#fcc;"
| 65 || March 24 || @ Vegas Golden Knights || 1–6 || || Saros || T-Mobile Arena || 18,021 || 37–24–4 || 78 || 
|- style="background:#cfc;"
| 66 || March 27 || Philadelphia Flyers || 5–4 || || Saros || Bridgestone Arena || 17,414 || 38–24–4 || 80 || 
|- style="background:#cfc;"
| 67 || March 29 || Ottawa Senators || 4–1 || || Saros || Bridgestone Arena || 17,176 || 39–24–4 || 82 || 
|-

|- style="background:#fcc;"
| 68 || April 1 || @ Buffalo Sabres || 3–4 || || Saros || KeyBank Center || 19,070 || 39–25–4 || 82 || 
|- style="background:#cfc;"
| 69 || April 5 || Minnesota Wild || 6–2 || || Saros || Bridgestone Arena || 17,244 || 40–25–4 || 84 || 
|- style="background:#cfc;"
| 70 || April 7 || @ Ottawa Senators || 3–2 || || Saros || Canadian Tire Centre || 12,103 || 41–25–4 || 86 || 
|- style="background:#fcc;"
| 71 || April 9 || Florida Panthers || 1–4 || || Saros || Bridgestone Arena || 17,465 || 41–26–4 || 86 || 
|- style="background:#ffc;"
| 72 || April 10 || @ Pittsburgh Penguins || 2–3 ||  OT || Rittich || PPG Paints Arena || 17,553 || 41–26–5 || 87 || 
|- style="background:#cfc;"
| 73 || April 12 || San Jose Sharks || 1–0 || OT || Saros || Bridgestone Arena || 17,159 || 42–26–5 || 89 || 
|- style="background:#fcc;"
| 74 || April 14 || Edmonton Oilers || 0–4 || || Saros || Bridgestone Arena || 17,403 || 42–27–5 || 89 || 
|- style="background:#cfc;"
| 75 || April 16 || Chicago Blackhawks || 4–3 || || Saros || Bridgestone Arena || 17,159 || 43–27–5 || 91 || 
|- style="background:#fcc;"
| 76 || April 17 || St. Louis Blues || 3–8 || || Saros || Bridgestone Arena || 17,277 || 43–28–5 || 91 || 
|- style="background:#cfc;"
| 77 || April 19 || Calgary Flames || 3–2 || SO || Saros || Bridgestone Arena || 17,237 || 44–28–5 || 93 || 
|- style="background:#fcc;"
| 78 || April 23 || @ Tampa Bay Lightning || 2–6 || || Saros || Amalie Arena || 19,092 || 44–29–5 || 93 || 
|- style="background:#ffc;"
| 79 || April 24 || Minnesota Wild || 4–5 || OT || Rittich || Bridgestone Arena || 17,160 || 44–29–6 || 94 || 
|- style="background:#ffc;"
| 80 || April 26 || Calgary Flames || 4–5 || OT || Rittich || Bridgestone Arena || 17,498 || 44–29–7 || 95 || 
|- style="background:#cfc;"
| 81 || April 28 || @ Colorado Avalanche || 5–4 || SO || Rittich || Ball Arena || 18,011 || 45–29–7 || 97 || 
|- style="background:#fcc;"
| 82 || April 29 || @ Arizona Coyotes || 4–5 || || Ingram || Gila River Arena || 15,123 || 45–30–7 || 97 || 
|-

|-
| 2021–22 schedule

Playoffs

Player statistics
As of April 30, 2022

Skaters

Goaltenders

†Denotes player spent time with another team before joining the Predators. Stats reflect time with the Predators only.
‡Denotes player was traded mid-season. Stats reflect time with the Predators only.
Bold/italics denotes franchise record.

Transactions
The Predators have been involved in the following transactions during the 2021–22 season.

Trades

Players acquired

Players lost

Signings

Draft picks

Below are the Nashville Predators' selections at the 2021 NHL Entry Draft, which were held on July 23 to 24, 2021. It was held virtually via Video conference call from the NHL Network studio in Secaucus, New Jersey.

References

Nashville Predators
2021–22 NHL season by team
Nashville Predators
Nashville Predators